Adam Siao Him Fa (born 31 January 2001) is a French figure skater. He is the 2023 European champion, the 2022 Grand Prix de France champion, the 2022 CS Lombardia Trophy champion, the 2021 CS Nebelhorn Trophy and 2021 CS Lombardia Trophy silver medalist, the 2019 CS Ice Star bronze medalist, and the 2023 French national champion. 

He is also the 2018 JGP Armenia champion and the 2018 JGP Canada silver medalist. He finished within the top six at the 2019 World Junior Championships. Siao Him Fa represented France at the 2022 Winter Olympics and finished 14th overall.

Personal life 
Siao Him Fa was born on 31 January 2001 in Bordeaux, France. He is the youngest of four children. His parents, Daniel, a doctor, and Patricia, are originally from Mauritius and moved to France in the early 1980s. He formerly attended Collège Hubertine Auclert in Toulouse.

Career

Early career 
Siao Him Fa began learning to skate in 2005 or 2006 in Bordeaux. As a child, he trained under Valerie Sou, Cornelia Paquier, Nathalie Depouilly, and Laurent Depouilly. He started training in Toulouse in 2011 because Bordeaux's ice rink was not operational. He debuted on the advanced novice level in March 2013 and won the French novice men's title in March 2014.

Coached by Rodolphe Maréchal and Baptiste Porquet in Toulouse, Siao Him Fa began appearing on the junior international level in October 2015. In February, he competed at the 2016 Winter Youth Olympics, placing tenth in Hamar, Norway. His ISU Junior Grand Prix (JGP) debut came in August 2016. He finished out of the top ten at both of his JGP assignments that season.

2017–2018 season 
In September 2017, Siao Him Fa began training under Brian Joubert at the 2007 World champion's skating club in Poitiers, France. He finished ninth at both of his JGP assignments. After placing fourth on the senior level at the French Championships in December 2017, he took silver at the junior event in February 2018. In March, he qualified for the final segment at the 2018 World Junior Championships; he ranked sixteenth in the short program, nineteenth in the free skate, and seventeenth overall at the event in Sofia, Bulgaria.

2018–2019 season 
Competing in the 2018 JGP series, Siao Him Fa took bronze in Richmond, British Columbia, Canada, and then gold in Yerevan, Armenia. Due to his results, he qualified to the JGP Final in Vancouver, Canada.  He placed fourth at the Final, setting new personal bests in the free skate and total score.  He won the silver medal at the 2019 French Figure Skating Championships.

Competing at his first European Championships, Siao Him Fa finished in twelfth place, setting three new personal bests in the process.  At the 2019 World Junior Championships, he placed eighth in the short program with a clean skate, and another new personal best.

2019–2020 season
Dogged by injury in the fall, Siao Him Fa did not repeat his earlier success on the Junior Grand Prix, finishing off the podium at both of his events.  In October, he stood on his first ISU Challenger Series podium, taking bronze at the 2019 CS Ice Star.  He repeated as French national silver medalist and national junior champion. 

In January, Siao Him Fa competed at the 2020 European Championships in Graz, Austria.  He was on the verge of not qualifying to the free skate after a poor performance in the short program, but unexpectedly made it in as the twenty-fourth and last to qualify after fellow Frenchman Kévin Aymoz failed to qualify despite previously being considered a favourite for the European men's title.  He performed much better in the free skate, landing three quadruple jumps to place sixth in the segment and rising to eleventh place overall.  He concluded his season with a seventh-place result at the 2020 World Junior Championships in Tallinn, Estonia. 

Siao Him Fa announced a coaching change on 28 May 2020, deciding to join Laurent Depouilly in Courbevoie.

2020–2021 season 
With the COVID-19 pandemic affecting international travel, the ISU opted to assign the Grand Prix based largely on geographic location.  Siao Him Fa was scheduled to make his Grand Prix debut at the 2020 Internationaux de France, but the event was cancelled. In February, Siao Him Fa won his third straight National silver medal.

Siao Him Fa finished the season as part of Team France at the 2021 World Team Trophy.  He placed eighth in the short program and ninth in the free skate, while the French team finished in fifth place overall.

2021–2022 season 
Siao Him Fa began the Olympic season competing at the 2021 CS Lombardia Trophy, where he won the silver medal and set three new personal bests. He was then assigned to the 2021 CS Nebelhorn Trophy, winning the silver medal and qualifying a second berth for French men at the 2022 Winter Olympics. He went on to make his Grand Prix debut at the 2021 Skate America, where he placed ninth. He was eighth at the 2021 Internationaux de France, setting a new personal best in the free skate.

After winning the silver medal at the French championships, Siao Him Fa was named to the French Olympic team. He placed fourteenth in the short program of the Olympic men's event. He was thirteenth in the free skate but remained in fourteenth overall.

Siao Him Fa concluded his season at the 2022 World Championships, held on home soil in Montpellier with a men's field considerably more open than usual due to the absences of Nathan Chen and Yuzuru Hanyu and the International Skating Union banning all Russian athletes due to their country's invasion of Ukraine. He finished tenth in the short program with a new personal best, and rose to eighth overall with a sixth-place free skate, both scores also new personal bests.

2022–2023 season 
Siao Him Fa began the season with his first ever Challenger gold medal at the 2022 CS Lombardia Trophy, and then took a second gold at the Cup of Nice. On the Grand Prix, he was third in the short program at the 2022 Grand Prix de France, but won the free skate to take the gold medal. This was the first Grand Prix win for a Frenchman since his former coach Brian Joubert won the NHK Trophy in 2009, a fact of which he was "very proud." He finished third in the short program at the 2022 NHK Trophy, his second event. He said “things didn't go as I planned, but I am positive about tomorrow and will continue to work this way." He finished fourth in the free skate but came fifth overall. 

Disappointed not to have qualified for the Grand Prix Final, Siao Him Fa went on to win his first French national title at the championships in Rouen, beating defending champion Kévin Aymoz by a margin of over twenty points. Siao Him Fa continued his streak of success into the new year, finishing in first place in the short program at the 2023 European Championships with a new personal best of 96.53, 10.07 points of Italian Matteo Rizzo in second place. He was "happy" to have finally skated cleanly in the short program internationally that season. He finished second in the free skate, 2.22 points behind Rizzo, but won the gold medal. This was the first European title for a Frenchman in twelve years, since Florent Amodio's victory in 2011.

Programs

Competitive highlights 
CS: Challenger Series; GP: Grand Prix; JGP: Junior Grand Prix

Detailed results 
Small medals for short and free programs awarded only at ISU Championships. Current ISU world bests highlighted in bold and italic.

Senior results

Junior results

References

External links 

 
 Adam Siao Him Fa Rink Results
 Official Instagram

French male single skaters
2001 births
Sportspeople from Bordeaux
Living people
French people of Mauritian descent
French people of Vietnamese descent
French people of Chinese descent
Figure skaters at the 2016 Winter Youth Olympics
Figure skaters at the 2022 Winter Olympics
Olympic figure skaters of France